Salvucci is a surname. Notable people with the surname include:

Frederick P. Salvucci (born 1940), American civil engineer and educator
Vinnie Salvucci, character in the movie All the Right Moves

See also
United States v. Salvucci